Amar Mehta (born November 19, 1990) is an American former figure skater and author. Mehta represented India in international competitions. At the 2007 World Junior Figure Skating Championships, he became the first man to represent India at an ISU Championship. His older sister Ami Parekh is also a competitive figure skater.

References

External links
 

1990 births
Living people
Sportspeople from Staten Island
American male single skaters
Indian male single skaters
American sportspeople of Indian descent
American expatriates in India